Taoism in Malaysia is followed by many Chinese. In general, owing to the decline in religious knowledge amongst the younger generations, many followers focus on rituals of Malaysian Chinese religion with little or no knowledge of Taoist scriptures and cultivation.

History 
Taoism arrived in Malaysia with Chinese settlers. Taoist practice later flourished as an increasing number of Chinese settled in Malaysia.

Many Taoist followers also worship ancestors and Bodhisattvas as these beliefs have traditionally enjoyed a peaceful coexistence, thereby leading to obscured delineation between them. There are also Chinese salvationist religions such as Wuweiism (無為教), the De religion which has also been well established in East Malaysia and Thailand, and Zhenkongism (真空教) that was popular among Hakka people before World War II for stopping people taking opium.

See also 
 Chinese folk religion in Southeast Asia
 Malaysian folk religion
 Zhizha & Religious goods store
 Zhengyi Taoism
 Taoism in Singapore
 Na Tuk Kong

References

External links 
 Taoism Malaysia 馬來西亞道教總會
 馬來西亞道教法師聯誼會

 
Religion in Malaysia